Seven Oaks is a residential neighborhood in Wesley Chapel, Pasco County, Florida, United States.

Community leadership
Seven Oaks is led by two boards that operate the community and regulate the properties inside it.  The first board is the homeowners association, known as Seven Oaks Property Owners Association.  The other governing body is the Seven Oaks Community Development District.  The community development district is actually a special-purpose tax district that encompasses the community and surrounding wetlands and forests.

References

Geography of Pasco County, Florida
Planned communities in Florida